The Insect Science Museum is a museum of insects in Zhongzheng District, Taipei, Taiwan. The museum is located at Cheng Kung Senior High School and it is one of the largest insect science museums in Asia.

History
The museum was constructed in 1968 and was opened to the public on 1971.

Exhibitions
The museum exhibits various collections of insects in the form of model specimens. In total, there are around 750 boxes and almost 40,000 specimens displayed at the museum.

Transportation
The museum is accessible within walking distance south from Shandao Temple Station of the Taipei Metro.

See also
 List of museums in Taiwan

References

1971 establishments in Taiwan
Museums established in 1971
Museums in Taipei
Natural history museums in Taiwan
Insects of Taiwan
Insectariums
Insect museums